Cristina Comencini (born 8 May 1956) is an Italian film director, screenwriter and novelist.

Biography
She is one of four daughters of Italian film director Luigi Comencini. She attended with her sisters the Lycée français Chateaubriand (Rome).
 
Cristina Comencini's 2005 film The Beast in the Heart, based on her own novel La bestia nel cuore, was nominated for an Academy Award for Best Foreign Language Film. Her upcoming film When the Night, also based on her own novel and published in the United States by Other Press, is scheduled to compete in competition at the 68th Venice International Film Festival in September.

She is mother of former Minister of Economic Development, Carlo Calenda.

Filmography
 1989: Zoo
 1993: La fine è nota
 1996: Va' dove ti porta il cuore
 1998: Matrimoni
 2000: Liberate i pesci!
 2002: The Best Day of My Life (Il più bel giorno della mia vita)
 2005: La mia mano destra
 2005: The Beast in the Heart (La bestia nel cuore)
 2008: Black and White
 2009: Due partite
 2011: When the Night (Quando la notte)
 2015: [[Latin Lover (film)|Latin Lover]] 2016: Something new 
 2018: Sex Story 2019: To ReturnBooks in Translation
 1994: The Missing Pages 2012: When the Night'', published by Other Press

References

External links

 
 Official Website (Italian)
 Speciale Cristina Comencini su Locanda Almayer

1956 births
Living people
Italian women film directors
Italian screenwriters
20th-century Italian novelists
21st-century Italian novelists
Italian women novelists
Writers from Rome
Film directors from Rome
21st-century Italian women writers
20th-century Italian women writers